The Hagia Sophia (Holy Wisdom) is a church located in Thessaloniki, Greece. With its current structure dating from the 7th century, it is one of the oldest churches in the city still standing today. Because of its outstanding Byzantine art and architecture, in addition to its importance in early Christianity, it is one of several monuments in Thessaloniki listed as a UNESCO World Heritage Site in 1988.

History
Since the 3rd century, there was a church in the location of the current Hagia Sophia. In 620, that church collapsed most likely because of an earthquake. Later in the 7th century, the present structure was erected, based on the Hagia Sophia in Constantinople (present-day Istanbul, Turkey). In 1205, when the Fourth Crusade captured the city, the Hagia Sophia was converted into the cathedral of Thessaloniki, which lasted until 1224, the year when the battalions of the Despotate of Epirus, under Theodore Komnenos Doukas, liberated the city. After the capture of Thessaloniki by the Ottoman Sultan Murad II on 29 March 1430, the church was converted into a mosque, called Ayasofya Camii, keeping its old name. It was reconverted to a church upon the liberation of Thessaloniki in 1912.

Its ground plan is that of a domed Greek cross basilica. Together with the Gül and the Kalenderhane Mosques in Istanbul and the destroyed Church of the Dormition in Nicaea, it represents one of the main architectural examples of this type, typical of the Byzantine middle period.

In the Iconoclastic era, the apse of the church was embellished with plain gold mosaics with only one great cross, similarly to the Hagia Irene in Constantinople and the Church of the Dormition in Nicaea. The cross was substituted with the image of the Theotokos (God-bearer, or Mary) in 787-797 after the victory of the Iconodules. The mosaic in the dome now represents the Ascension with the inscription from Acts 1:11 "Ye men of Galilee, why stand ye gazing up into heaven?". The dome is ringed by the figures of all Twelve Apostles, Mary and two angels.

Between 1907 and 1909 Byzantine historian Charles Diehl restored the whole building that underwent many damages during a fire in 1890. Much of the interior decoration was plastered over after the Great Thessaloniki Fire of 1917. The dome was not restored until 1980.

Gallery

See also
History of Roman and Byzantine domes

References

Cathedral church of Holy God's Wisdom of Thessaloniki
Agia Sofia Thessaloniki

Bibliography

External links

Agia Sofia of Thessaloniki
Hellenic Ministry of Culture

World Heritage Sites in Greece
Christianity in Roman Macedonia
Roman Thessalonica
Byzantine church buildings in Thessaloniki
Church buildings with domes
Former mosques in Greece
Mosques converted from churches in Ottoman Greece